Edward Rider Cook (4 June 1836 – 21 August 1898) was an English soap manufacturer and Liberal politician who sat in the House of Commons from 1885 to 1886.

Cook was born at Whitechapel, the son of Edward Cook of Crix, Hatfield Peverel, Essex and his wife Anne Rider.  He was educated at City of London School, and at University College, London, where he studied  theoretical and analytical chemistry. He was senior partner in the firm of Edward Cook & Co., soap makers and chemical manufacturers of Bow. In 1865, he became a member for Poplar at the Metropolitan Board of Works. He was chairman of the unsuccessful  London Riverside Fish Market Co. of Shadwell, Honorary Treasurer of Society of Chemical Industry,  and a Conservator of River Lea. He was also F.C.S., a J.P. for Middlesex and was described as an advanced Liberal.

He was elected at the 1885 general election as Member of Parliament (MP) for West Ham North, but lost the seat in the 1886 general election.

Cook married firstly Edith Piper in 1860, and secondly  Ellen Leonard of Clifton, Bristol in 1873.  He died of a cerebral hemorrhage at his residence, Woodford House, Woodford Green, Essex, in August 1898 aged 62.

References

External links 

1836 births
1898 deaths
Liberal Party (UK) MPs for English constituencies
UK MPs 1885–1886
People from Woodford, London
People educated at the City of London School
Alumni of University College London
Members of the Metropolitan Board of Works